Little Marlow Priory was a priory in Buckinghamshire, England. It was run for many years as a nunnery. It was established around 1218 and dissolved in 1536.

References

Monasteries in Buckinghamshire
Nunneries in England
1536 disestablishments in England
1218 establishments in England
Christian monasteries established in the 13th century